Political aspects of Islam are derived from the Quran, ḥadīth literature, and sunnah (accounts of the sayings and living habits attributed to the Islamic prophet Muhammad during his lifetime), the history of Islam, and elements of political movements outside Islam. Traditional political concepts in Islam include leadership by elected or selected successors to Muhammad, known as Caliphs in Sunnī Islam and Imams in Shīʿa Islam; the importance of following the Islamic law (sharīʿa); the duty of rulers to seek consultation (shūrā) from their subjects; and the importance of rebuking unjust rulers.

A significant change in the Muslim world was the defeat and dissolution of the Ottoman Empire (1908–1922). In the modern era (19th–20th centuries), common Islamic political themes have been resistance to Western imperialism and enforcement of sharīʿa law through democratic or militant struggle. Events such as the defeat of Arab armies in the Six-Day War, the collapse of the Soviet Union, the end of the Cold War and the fall of communism as a viable alternative have increased the appeal of Islamic movements such as Islamism, Islamic fundamentalism, and Islamic democracy, especially in the context of the global sectarian divide and conflict between Sunnīs and Shīʿītes, along with the popular dissatisfaction with secularist ruling regimes in the Muslim world.

Pre-modern Islam

Origins of Islam

Early Islam arose within the historical, social, political, economic, and religious context of Late Antiquity in the Middle East. The second half of the 6th century CE saw political disorder in the pre-Islamic Arabian peninsula, and communication routes were no longer secure. Religious divisions played an important role in the crisis. Judaism became the dominant religion of the Himyarite Kingdom in Yemen after about 380 CE, while Christianity took root in the Persian Gulf. There was also a yearning for a more "spiritual form of religion", and "the choice of religion increasingly became an individual rather than a collective issue." While some Arabs were reluctant to convert to a foreign faith, those Abrahamic religions provided "the principal intellectual and spiritual reference points", and Jewish and Christian loanwords from Aramaic began to replace the old pagan vocabulary of Arabic throughout the peninsula. The Ḥanīf ("renunciates"), a group of monotheists that sought to separate themselves both from the foreign Abrahamic religions and the traditional Arab polytheism, were looking for a new religious worldview to replace the pre-Islamic Arabian religions, focusing on "the all-encompassing father god Allah whom they freely equated with the Jewish Yahweh and the Christian Jehovah." In their view, Mecca was originally dedicated to this monotheistic faith that they considered to be the one true religion, established by the patriarch Abraham.

According to the traditional account, the Islamic prophet Muhammad was born in Mecca around the year 570 CE. His family belonged to the Arab clan of Quraysh, which was the chief tribe of Mecca and a dominant force in western Arabia. To counter the effects of anarchy, they upheld the institution of "sacred months" when all violence was forbidden and travel was safe. The polytheistic Kaaba shrine in Mecca and the surrounding area was a popular pilgrimage destination, which had significant economic consequences for the city.

The origins of Islam as a religious and political movement are to be found in the life and times of the Islamic prophet Muhammad and his successors. In 622 CE, in recognition of his claims to prophethood, Muhammad was invited to rule the city of Medina. At the time the local Arab tribes of Aus and Khazraj dominated the town, and were in constant conflict. Medinans considered Muhammad as an impartial outsider who could resolve the conflict. Muhammad and his followers thus moved to Medina, where Muhammad drafted the Constitution of Medina. The laws Muhammad established during his rule, based on the Quran and his own doing, are considered by Muslims to be sharīʿa or Islamic law, which Islamic movements seek to re-establish in the present day. Muhammad gained a widespread following and an army, and his rule expanded first to the city of Mecca and then spread across the Arabian peninsula through a combination of diplomacy and military conquests.

The real intentions of Muhammad regarding the spread of Islam, its political undertone, and his missionary activity (da’wah) during his lifetime are a contentious matter of debate, which has been extensively discussed both among Muslim scholars and Non-Muslim scholars within the academic field of Islamic studies. Various authors, Islamic activists, and historians of Islam have proposed several understandings of Muhammad's intent and ambitions regarding his religio-political mission in the context of the pre-Islamic Arabian society and the founding of his own religion:

Quran

Most likely Muhammad was "intimately aware of Jewish belief and practices," and acquainted with the Ḥanīf. Like the Ḥanīf, Muhammad practiced Taḥannuth, spending time in seclusion at mount Hira and "turning away from paganism." When he was about 40 years old, he began receiving at mount Hira' what Muslims regard as divine revelations delivered through the angel Gabriel, which would later form the Quran. These inspirations urged him to proclaim a strict monotheistic faith, as the final expression of Biblical prophetism earlier codified in the sacred texts of Judaism and Christianity; to warn his compatriots of the impending Judgement Day; and to castigate social injustices of his city. Muhammad's message won over a handful of followers (the ṣaḥāba) and was met with increasing opposition from Meccan notables. In 622 CE, a few years after losing protection with the death of his influential uncle ʾAbū Ṭālib ibn ʿAbd al-Muṭṭalib, Muhammad migrated to the city of Yathrib (subsequently called Medina) where he was joined by his followers. Later generations would count this event, known as the hijra, as the start of the Islamic era.

In Yathrib, where he was accepted as an arbitrator among the different communities of the city under the terms of the Constitution of Medina, Muhammad began to lay the foundations of the new Islamic society, with the help of new Quranic verses which provided guidance on matters of law and religious observance. The surahs of this period emphasized his place among the long line of Biblical prophets, but also differentiated the message of the Quran from the sacred texts of Christianity and Judaism. Armed conflict with the Arab Meccans and Jewish tribes of the Yathrib area soon broke out. After a series of military confrontations and political manoeuvres, Muhammad was able to secure control of Mecca and allegiance of the Quraysh in 629 CE. In the time remaining until his death in 632 CE, tribal chiefs across the Arabian peninsula entered into various agreements with him, some under terms of alliance, others acknowledging his claims of prophethood and agreeing to follow Islamic practices, including paying the alms levy to his government, which consisted of a number of deputies, an army of believers, and a public treasury.

In Islam, "the Qurʾān is conceived by Muslims to be the word of God spoken to Muḥammad and then passed on to humanity in exactly the same form as it was received". While the Quran doesn't dwell on politics, it does make mention of concepts such as "the oppressed" (mustad'afeen), "emigration" (hijra), the "Muslim community" (Ummah), and "fighting" or "struggling" in the way of God (jihād), that can have political implications. A number of Quranic verses (such as ) talk about the mustad'afeen, which can be translated as "those deemed weak", "underdogs", or "the oppressed", how they are put upon by people such as the pharaoh, how God wishes them to be treated justly, and how they should emigrate from the land where they are oppressed. Abraham was an "emigrant unto my Lord". War against "unbelievers" (kuffār) is commanded and divine aid promised, although some verses state this may be when unbelievers start the war and treaties may end the war. The Quran also devotes some verses to the proper division of spoils captured in war among the victors. War against internal enemies or "hypocrites" (munāfiḳūn) is also commanded. Some commands did not extend past the life of Muhammad, such as ones to refer quarrels to Allah and Muhammad or not to shout at or raise your voice when talking to Muhammad. Limiting its political teaching is the fact that the Quran doesn't mention "any formal and continuing structure of authority", only orders to obey Muhammad, and that its themes were of limited use when the success of Islam meant governance of "a vast territory populate mainly peasants, and dominate by cities and states" alien to nomadic life in the desert.

Islamic State of Medina
The Constitution of Medina was drafted by Muhammad. It constituted a formal agreement between Muhammad and all of the significant tribes and families of Yathrib (later known as Medina), including Muslims, Jews, Christians, and Arab Pagans. This constitution formed the basis of the first Islamic state. The document was drawn up with the explicit concern of bringing to an end the bitter intertribal fighting between the clans of the Aws (Aus and Khazraj) within Medina. To this effect it instituted a number of rights and responsibilities for the Muslim, Jewish, Christian, and Pagan communities of Medina, bringing them within the fold of one community: the Ummah.

The precise dating of the Constitution of Medina remains debated but generally scholars agree it was written shortly after the hijra (622 CE).

 
It effectively established the first Islamic state. The Constitution established: the security of the community, religious freedoms, the role of Medina as a haram or sacred place (barring all violence and weapons), the security of women, stable tribal relations within Medina, a tax system for supporting the community in time of conflict, parameters for exogenous political alliances, a system for granting protection of individuals, a judicial system for resolving disputes, and also regulated the paying of blood money (the payment between families or tribes for the slaying of an individual in lieu of lex talionis).

Early Caliphate and political ideals

After the death of Muhammad in 632 CE, his community needed to appoint a new leader, giving rise to the title of caliph. Thus, the subsequent Islamic empires were known as "caliphates", and a series of four caliphs governed the early Islamic empire: Abū Bakr (632–634), ʿUmar ibn al-Khaṭṭāb (Umar І, 634–644), ʿUthmān ibn ʿAffān (644–656), and ʿAlī ibn Abī Ṭālib (656–661). These leaders are known as the rāshidūn ("rightly-guided") caliphs in Sunnī Islam. They oversaw the initial phase of the early Muslim conquests, advancing through Persia, the Levant, Egypt, and North Africa.

Alongside the growth of the Umayyad Caliphate, the major political development within early Islam in this period was the sectarian split and political divide between Kharijite, Sunnī, and Shīʿa Muslims; this had its roots in a dispute over the succession for the role of caliph. Sunnīs believed the caliph was elective and any Muslim from the Arab clan of Quraysh, the tribe of Muhammad, might serve as one. Shīʿītes, on the other hand, believed the title of caliph should be hereditary in the bloodline of Muhammad, and thus all the caliphs, with the exceptions of Muhammad's cousin and son-in-law ʿAlī ibn Abī Ṭālib and his firstborn son Ḥasan, were actually illegitimate usurpers. However, the Sunnī sect emerged as triumphant in most regions of the Muslim world, with the exceptions of Iran and Oman; thus, most modern Islamic political ideologies and movements are founded in Sunnī thought. Muhammad's closest companions (ṣaḥāba), the four "rightly-guided" caliphs who succeeded him, continued to expand the Islamic empire to encompass Jerusalem, Ctesiphon, and Damascus, and sending Arab Muslim armies as far as the Sindh region. The early Islamic empire stretched from al-Andalus (Muslim Iberia) to the Punjab region under the reign of the Umayyad dynasty.

One type of ruler not part of the Islamic ideal was the king, which was disparaged in the Quranic mentions of the Pharaoh, "the prototype of the unjust and tyrannical ruler" and elsewhere. The phrase Ahl al-Ḥall wa’l-‘Aḳd was used in order to denote those qualified to appoint or depose a caliph or another ruler on behalf of the Ummah. Olivier Roy writes that

Election or appointment

Al-Mawardi, a Sunnī Muslim jurist of the Shāfiʿī school of Islamic jurisprudence, wrote that the caliph should be a member of the Quraysh tribe. Abu Bakr al-Baqillani, an Ashʿarī Sunnī Muslim scholar and Mālikī jurist, wrote that the leader of the Muslims simply should be elected from the majority. Abu Hanifa an-Nu‘man, the founder of the Sunnī Ḥanafī school, also wrote that the leader must come from the majority.

Western scholar of Islam, Fred Donner, argues that the standard Arabian practice during the early caliphates was for the prominent men of a kinship group, or tribe, to gather after a leader's death and elect a leader from amongst themselves, although there was no specified procedure for this shura, or consultative assembly. Candidates were usually from the same lineage as the deceased leader but they were not necessarily his sons. Capable men who would lead well were preferred over an ineffectual direct heir, as there was no basis in the majority Sunnī view that the head of state or governor should be chosen based on lineage alone.

Majlis ash-Shura
Deliberations in the politics of the early caliphates, most notably the Rāshidūn Caliphate, were not "democratic" in the modern sense of the term; rather, decision-making power laid with a council (shura) of notable and trusted companions of Muhammad (ṣaḥāba) and representatives of different Arab tribes (most of them selected or elected within their tribes). Traditional Sunnī Muslim jurists agree that the shura, loosely translated as "consultation", is a function of the Islamic caliphate. The Majlis-ash-Shura advise the caliph. The importance of this is premised by the following verses of the Quran:

The majlis were also the means to elect a new caliph. Al-Mawardi wrote that members of the majlis should satisfy three conditions: they must be just, they must have enough knowledge to distinguish a good caliph from a bad one, and must have sufficient wisdom and judgment to select the best caliph. Al-Mawardi also stated that in case of emergencies when there is no caliphate and no majlis, the people themselves should institute a council of majlis, select a list of candidates for the role of caliph, then the majlis should select from the list of candidates.

Some modern political interpretations regarding the role of the Majlis ash-Shura include those expressed by the Egyptian Islamist author and ideologue Sayyid Qutb, prominent member of the Muslim Brotherhood, and the Palestinian Muslim scholar and propagandist Taqiuddin al-Nabhani, founder of the pan-Islamist political party Hizb ut-Tahrir. In an analysis of the shura chapter of the Quran, Qutb argued that Islam requires only that the ruler consult with at least some of the ruled (usually the elite), within the general context of divine laws that the ruler must execute. Al-Nabhani argued that the shura is important and part of "the ruling structure" of the Islamic caliphate, "but not one of its pillars", and may be neglected without the caliphate's rule becoming un-Islamic. However, these interpretations formulated by Qutb and al-Nabhani are not universally accepted in the Islamic political thought, and Islamic democrats consider the shura to be an integral part and important pillar of Islamic political system.

Separation of powers

In the early Islamic caliphates, the caliph was the head of state, and had a position based on the notion of a successor to Muhammad's political authority, who, according to Sunnī Muslims, were ideally elected by the people or their representatives, as was the case for the election of Abū Bakr (632–634), ʿUthmān ibn ʿAffān (644–656), and ʿAlī ibn Abī Ṭālib (656–661). After the rāshidūn caliphs, later caliphates during the Islamic Golden Age had a much lesser degree of democratic participation, but since "no one was superior to anyone else except on the basis of piety and virtue" in Islam, and following the example of Muhammad, later Islamic rulers often held public consultations with the people in their affairs.

The legislative power of the caliph (or later, the sultan) was always restricted by the scholarly class, the ulama, a group regarded as the guardians of Islamic law. Since the sharia law was established and regulated by the schools of Islamic jurisprudence, this prevented the caliph from dictating legal results. Sharia-compliant rulings were established as authoritative based on the ijma (consensus) of legal Muslim scholars, who theoretically acted as representatives of the entire Ummah (Muslim community). After law colleges (madrasa) became widespread beginning with the 11th and 12th century CE, students of Islamic jurisprudence often had to obtain an ijaza-t al-tadris wa-l-ifta ("license to teach and issue legal opinions") in order to issue valid legal rulings. In many ways, classical Islamic law functioned like a constitutional law.

Practically, for hundreds of years after the fall of the Rāshidūn Caliphate (7th century CE) and until the first half of the 20th century, Muslim-majority countries usually adopted a system of government based on the coexistence of the sultan and ulama which followed the rules of the sharia law. This system resembled to some extent some Western governments in possessing an unwritten constitution (like the United Kingdom), and possessing separate, countervailing branches of government (like the United States), which provided a clear separation of powers in socio-political governance. While the United States and some other systems of government have three separate branches of government—executive, legislative, and judicial—Islamic monarchies had two: the sultan and the ulama.

According to the French political scientist and professor Olivier Roy, this "de facto separation between political power" of sultans and emirs and religious power of the caliph was "created and institutionalized ... as early as the end of the first century of the hegira." The sovereign's religious function was to defend the Muslim community against its enemies, institute the sharia, ensure the public good (maslaha). The state was instrument to enable Muslims to live as good Muslims and Muslims were to obey the sultan if he did so. The legitimacy of the ruler was "symbolized by the right to coin money and to have the Friday prayer (Jumu'ah khutba) said in his name."

British lawyer and journalist Sadakat Kadri argues that a large "degree of deference" was shown to the caliphate by the ulama and this was at least at times "counterproductive". "Although jurists had identified conditions from mental incapacity to blindness that could disqualify a caliph, none had ever dared delineate the powers of the caliphate as an institution."  During the Abbasid caliphate:

When Caliph Al-Mutawakkil had been killed in 861, jurists had retroactively validated his murder with a fatwa. Eight years later, they had testified to the lawful abdication of a successor, after he had been dragged from a toilet, beaten unconscious, and thrown into a vault to die. By the middle of the tenth century, judges were solemnly confirming that the onset of blindness had disqualified a caliph, without mentioning that they had just been assembled to witness the gouging of his eyes.

According to Noah Feldman, law professor at Harvard University, the Muslim legal scholars and jurists lost their control over Islamic law due to the codification of sharia by the Ottoman Empire in the early 19th century:

Obedience and opposition

According to scholar Moojan Momen, "One of the key statements in the Qur'an around which much of the exegesis" on the issue of what Islamic doctrine says about who is in charge is based on the verse "O believers! Obey God and obey the Apostle and those who have been given authority [uulaa al-amr] among you".

For Sunnīs, the expression "those who have been given authority" (uulaa al-amr) refers to the rulers (caliphs and kings), but for Shīʿas it refers to the Imams. According to the British historian and Orientalist scholar Bernard Lewis, this Quranic verse has been
elaborated in a number of sayings attributed to Muhammad. But there are also sayings that put strict limits on the duty of obedience. Two dicta attributed to the Prophet and universally accepted as authentic are indicative. One says, "there is no obedience in sin"; in other words, if the ruler orders something contrary to the divine law, not only is there no duty of obedience, but there is a duty of disobedience. This is more than the right of revolution that appears in Western political thought. It is a duty of revolution, or at least of disobedience and opposition to authority. The other pronouncement, "do not obey a creature against his creator," again clearly limits the authority of the ruler, whatever form of ruler that may be.

According to the exegetical interpretation of the medieval Sunnī Muslim scholar Ibn Taymiyyah, for this verse "there is no obedience in sin"; that people should ignore the order of the ruler if it would disobey the divine law and shouldn't use this as excuse for revolution because it will spill Muslims' blood. According to Ibn Taymiyyah, the saying "sixty years with an unjust imam is better than one night without a sultan" was confirmed by experience.

Sharia and governance (siyasa)

Starting from the late medieval period, Sunni fiqh elaborated the doctrine of siyasa shar'iyya, which literally means governance according to sharia, and is sometimes called the political dimension of Islamic law. Its goal was to harmonize Islamic law with the practical demands of statecraft. The doctrine emphasized the religious purpose of political authority and advocated non-formalist application of Islamic law if required by expedience and utilitarian considerations. It first emerged in response to the difficulties raised by the strict procedural requirements of Islamic law. The law rejected circumstantial evidence and insisted on witness testimony, making criminal convictions difficult to obtain in courts presided over by qadis (sharia judges). In response, Islamic jurists permitted greater procedural latitude in limited circumstances, such as adjudicating grievances against state officials in the mazalim courts administered by the ruler's council and application of "corrective" discretionary punishments for petty offenses. However, under the Mamluk sultanate, non-qadi courts expanded their jurisdiction to commercial and family law, running in parallel with sharia courts and dispensing with some formalities prescribed by fiqh. Further developments of the doctrine attempted to resolve this tension between statecraft and jurisprudence. In later times the doctrine has been employed to justify legal changes made by the state in consideration of public interest, as long as they were deemed not to be contrary to sharia. It was, for example, invoked by the Ottoman rulers who promulgated a body of administrative, criminal, and economic laws known as qanun.

Shīʿa tradition

In Shīʿa Islam, three attitudes towards rulers predominated — political cooperation with the ruler, political activism challenging the ruler, and aloofness from politics — with "writings of Shi'i ulama through the ages" showing "elements of all three of these attitudes."

Kharijite tradition

Islamic extremism dates back to the early history of Islam with the emergence of the Kharijites in the 7th century CE. The original schism between Kharijites, Sunnīs, and Shīʿas among Muslims was disputed over the political and religious succession to the guidance of the Muslim community (Ummah) after the death of the Islamic prophet Muhammad. From their essentially political position, the Kharijites developed extreme doctrines that set them apart from both mainstream Sunnī and Shīʿa Muslims. Shīʿas believe ʿAlī ibn Abī Ṭālib is the true successor to Muhammad, while Sunnīs consider Abu Bakr to hold that position. The Kharijites broke away from both the Shīʿas and the Sunnīs during the First Fitna (the first Islamic Civil War); they were particularly noted for adopting a radical approach to takfīr (excommunication), whereby they declared both Sunnī and Shīʿa Muslims to be either infidels (kuffār) or false Muslims (munāfiḳūn), and therefore deemed them worthy of death for their perceived apostasy (ridda).

The Islamic tradition traces the origin of the Kharijities to the battle between ʿAlī and Mu'awiya at Siffin in 657 CE. When ʿAlī was faced with a military stalemate and agreed to submit the dispute to arbitration, some of his party withdrew their support from him. "Judgement belongs to God alone" (لاَ حُكْكْ إلَا لِلّهِ) became the slogan of these secessionists. They also called themselves al-Shurat ("the Vendors"), to reflect their willingness to sell their lives in martyrdom.

These original Kharijites opposed both ʿAlī and Mu'awiya, and appointed their own leaders. They were decisively defeated by ʿAlī, who was in turn assassinated by a Kharijite. Kharijites engaged in guerilla warfare against the Umayyads, but only became a movement to be reckoned with during the Second Fitna (the second Islamic Civil War) when they at one point controlled more territory than any of their rivals. The Kharijites were, in fact, one of the major threats to Ibn al-Zubayr's bid for the caliphate; during this time they controlled Yamama and most of southern Arabia, and captured the oasis town of al-Ta'if.

The Azariqa, considered to be the extreme faction of the Kharijites, controlled parts of western Iran under the Umayyads until they were finally put down in 699 CE. The more moderate Ibadi Kharijites were longer-lived, continuing to wield political power in North and East Africa and in eastern Arabia during the Abbasid period. Because of their readiness to declare any opponent as apostate, the extreme Kharijites tended to fragment into small groups. One of the few points that the various Kharijite splinter groups held in common was their view of the caliphate, which differed from other Muslim theories on two points.

 First, they were principled egalitarians, holding that any pious Muslim ("even an Ethiopian slave") can become Caliph and that family or tribal affiliation is inconsequential. The only requirements for leadership are piety and acceptance by the community. 
 Second, they agreed that it is the duty of the believers to depose any leader who falls into error. This second principle had profound implications for Kharijite theology. Applying these ideas to the early history of the caliphate, Kharijites only accept Abu Bakr and 'Umar as legitimate caliphs. Of 'Uthman's caliphate they recognize only the first six years as legitimate, and they reject 'Ali altogether.

By the time that Ibn al-Muqaffa' wrote his political treatise early in the 'Abbasid period, the Kharijites were no longer a significant political threat, at least in the Islamic heartlands. The memory of the menace they had posed to Muslim unity and of the moral challenge generated by their pious idealism still weighed heavily on Muslim political and religious thought, however. Even if the Kharijites could no longer threaten, their ghosts still had to be answered. The Ibadis are the only Kharijite group to survive into modern times.

Modern era

Reaction to European colonialism
In the 19th century, European colonization of the Muslim world coincided with the French conquest of Algeria (1830), the fall of the Mughal Empire in India (1857), the Russian incursions into the Caucasus (1828) and Central Asia (1830-1895), and ultimately in the 20th century with the defeat and dissolution of the Ottoman Empire (1908–1922), to which the Ottoman officer and Turkish revolutionary statesman Mustafa Kemal Atatürk had an instrumental role in ending and replacing it with the Republic of Turkey, a modern, secular democracy (see Abolition of the Caliphate, Abolition of the Ottoman sultanate, Kemalism, and Secularism in Turkey).

The first Muslim reaction to European colonization was of "peasant and religious", not urban origin. "Charismatic leaders", generally members of the ulama or leaders of religious orders, launched the call for jihad and formed tribal coalitions. Sharia, in defiance of local common law, was imposed to unify tribes. Examples include Abd al-Qadir in Algeria, Muhammad Ahmad in Sudan, Shamil in the Caucasus, the Senussi in Libya and Chad, Mullah-i Lang in Afghanistan, the Akhund of Swat in India, and later, Abd al-Karim in Morocco. All these movements eventually failed "despite spectacular victories such as the massacre of the British army in Afghanistan in 1842 and the taking of Kharoum in 1885."

Hussein bin Ali, the Sharif and Emir of Mecca from 1908, enthroned himself as King of the Hejaz after proclaiming the Great Arab Revolt against the Ottoman Empire, and continued to hold both of the offices of Sharif and King from 1916 to 1924. At the end of his reign he also briefly laid claim to the office of Sharifian Caliph; he was a 37th-generation direct descendant of Muhammad, as he belongs to the Hashemite family. A member of the Dhawu Awn clan (Banu Hashim) from the Qatadid emirs of Mecca, he was perceived to have rebellious inclinations and in 1893 was summoned to Istanbul, where he was kept on the Council of State. In 1908, in the aftermath of the Young Turk Revolution, he was appointed Emir of Mecca by the Ottoman sultan Abdul Hamid II. In 1916, with the promise of British support for Arab independence, he proclaimed the Great Arab Revolt against the Ottoman Empire, accusing the Committee of Union and Progress of violating tenets of Islam and limiting the power of the sultan-caliph. Shortly after the outbreak of the revolt, Hussein declared himself "King of the Arab Countries". However, his pan-Arab aspirations were not accepted by the Allies, who recognized him only as King of the Hejaz. In the aftermath of World War I, Hussein refused to ratify the Treaty of Versailles, in protest at the Balfour Declaration and the establishment of British and French mandates in Syria, Iraq, and Palestine. He later refused to sign the Anglo-Hashemite Treaty and thus deprived himself of British support when his kingdom was attacked by Ibn Saud. After the Kingdom of Hejaz was invaded by the Al Saud-Wahhabi armies of the Ikhwan, on 23 December 1925 King Hussein bin Ali surrendered to the Saudis, bringing both the Kingdom of Hejaz and the Sharifate of Mecca to an end.

The second Muslim reaction to European encroachment later in the century and early 20th century was not violent resistance but the adoption of some Western  political, social, cultural and technological ways. Members of the urban elite, particularly in Egypt, Iran, and Turkey, advocated and practiced "Westernization". The failure of the attempts at political westernization, according to some, was exemplified by the Tanzimat reorganization of the Ottoman rulers. Sharia was codified into law (which was called the Mecelle) and an elected legislature was established to make law. These steps took away the ulama'''s role of "discovering" the law and the formerly powerful scholar class weakened and withered into religious functionaries, while the legislature was suspended less than a year after its inauguration and never recovered to replace the Ulama as a separate "branch" of government providing separation of powers. The "paradigm of the executive as a force unchecked by either the sharia of the scholars or the popular authority of an elected legislature became the dominant paradigm in most of the Sunni Muslim world in the 20th century."

Modern political ideal of the Islamic state

In addition to the legitimacy given by medieval scholarly opinion, nostalgia for the days of successful Islamic empires simmered under later Western colonialism. This nostalgia played a major role in the Islamist political ideal of the Islamic state, a state in which Islamic law is preeminent. The Islamist political program is generally to be accomplished by re-shaping the governments of existing Muslim nation-states; but the means of doing this varies greatly across movements and circumstances. Many democratic Islamist movements, such as the Jamaat-e-Islami and Muslim Brotherhood, have used the democratic process and focus on votes and coalition-building with other political parties.

Sayyid Qutb, an Egyptian Islamist ideologue and prominent figurehead of the Muslim Brotherhood in Egypt, was influential in promoting the Pan-Islamist ideology in the 1960s. When he was executed by the Egyptian government under the regime of Gamal Abdel Nasser, Ayman al-Zawahiri formed the organization Egyptian Islamic Jihad to replace the government with an Islamic state that would reflect Qutb's ideas for the Islamic revival that he yearned for. The Qutbist ideology has been influential on jihadist movements and Islamic terrorists that seek to overthrow secular governments, most notably Osama bin Laden and Ayman al-Zawahiri of al-Qaeda, as well as the Salafi-jihadi terrorist group ISIL/ISIS/IS/Daesh. Moreover, Qutb's books have been frequently been cited by Osama bin Laden and Anwar al-Awlaki.Robert Irwin, "Is this the man who inspired Bin Laden?" The Guardian (1 November 2001).Out of the Shadows: Getting ahead of prisoner radicalizationQutbism: An Ideology of Islamic-Fascism  by Dale C. Eikmeier. From Parameters, Spring 2007, pp. 85–98.

Sayyid Qutb could be said to have founded the actual movement of radical Islam. Radical Islamic movements such as al-Qaeda and the Taliban embrace the militant Islamist ideology, and were prominent for being part of the anti-Soviet resistance in Afghanistan during the 1980s. Both of the aforementioned militant Islamist groups had a role to play in the September 11 terrorist attacks in 2001, presenting both "near" and "far" enemies as regional governments and the United States respectively. They also took part in the bombings in Madrid in 2004 and London in 2005. The recruits often came from the ranks of jihadists, from Egypt, Algeria, Saudi Arabia, and Morocco.

Compatibility with democracy

General Muslim views
Western scholars John Esposito and Natana J. DeLong-Bas distinguish four attitudes toward sharia and democracy prominent among Muslims today:

 Advocacy of democratic ideas, often accompanied by a belief that they are compatible with Islam, which can play a public role within a democratic system, as exemplified by many protestors who took part in the Arab Spring uprisings;
 Support for democratic procedures such as elections, combined with religious or moral objections toward some aspects of Western democracy seen as incompatible with sharia, as exemplified by Islamic scholars like Yusuf al-Qaradawi;
 Rejection of democracy as a Western import and advocacy of traditional Islamic institutions, such as shura (consultation) and ijma (consensus), as exemplified by supporters of absolute monarchy and radical Islamist movements;
 Belief that democracy requires restricting religion to private life, held by a minority in the Muslim world.

Polls conducted by Gallup and Pew Research Center in Muslim-majority countries indicate that most Muslims see no contradiction between democratic values and religious principles, desiring neither a theocracy, nor a secular democracy, but rather a political model where democratic institutions and values can coexist with the values and principles of sharia.

Islamic political theories
Muslih and Browers identify three major perspectives on democracy among prominent Muslims thinkers who have sought to develop modern, distinctly Islamic theories of socio-political organization conforming to Islamic values and law:

 The rejectionist Islamic view, elaborated by Muhammad Rashid Rida, Sayyid Qutb and Abul A'la Maududi, condemns imitation of foreign ideas, drawing a distinction between Western democracy and the Islamic doctrine of shura (consultation between ruler and ruled). This perspective, which stresses comprehensive implementation of sharia, was widespread in the 1970s and 1980s among various movements seeking to establish an Islamic state, but its popularity has diminished in recent years.
 The moderate Islamic view stresses the concepts of maslaha (public interest), ʿadl (justice), and shura. Islamic leaders are considered to uphold justice if they promote public interest, as defined through shura. In this view, shura provides the basis for representative government institutions that are similar to Western democracy, but reflect Islamic rather than Western liberal values. Hasan al-Turabi, Rashid al-Ghannushi, and Yusuf al-Qaradawi have advocated different forms of this view.
 The liberal Islamic view is influenced by Muhammad Abduh's emphasis on the role of reason in understanding religion. It stresses democratic principles based on pluralism and freedom of thought. Authors like Fahmi Huwaidi and Tariq al-Bishri have constructed Islamic justifications for full citizenship of non-Muslims in an Islamic state by drawing on early Islamic texts. Others, like Mohammed Arkoun and Nasr Hamid Abu Zayd, have justified pluralism and freedom through non-literalist approaches to textual interpretation. Abdolkarim Soroush has argued for a "religious democracy" based on religious thought that is democratic, tolerant, and just. Islamic liberals argue for the necessity of constant reexamination of religious understanding, which can only be done in a democratic context.

20th and 21st centuries

Following World War I, the defeat and dissolution of the Ottoman Empire, and the subsequent abolition of the Caliphate by Mustafa Kemal Atatürk, founder of the modern Republic of Turkey, many Muslims perceived that the political power of their religion was in retreat. There was also concern that Western ideas and influence were spreading throughout Muslim societies. This led to considerable resentment of the influence of the European powers. The Muslim Brotherhood was created in Egypt as a movement to resist and harry the British.

Between the 1950s and the 1960s, the predominant ideology within the Arab world was pan-Arabism, which de-emphasized religion and encouraged the creation of socialist, secular states based on Arab nationalist ideologies such as Nasserism and Baathism rather than Islam. However, governments based on Arab nationalism have found themselves facing economic stagnation and disorder. Increasingly, the borders of these states were seen as artificial colonial creations - which they were, having literally been drawn on a map by European colonial powers.

Today, many Islamist and Islamic democratic political parties exist in most Muslim-majority countries, alongside numerous insurgent Islamic extremist, militant Islamist, and terrorist movements and organizations. Both of the following terms, Islamic democracy and Islamic fundamentalism, lump together a large variety of political groups with varying aims, histories, ideologies, and backgrounds.

Contemporary movements
Some common political currents in Islam include:
Sunni Traditionalism, which accepts traditional commentaries on the Quran, hadith literature, and sunnah, and "takes as its basic principle imitation (taqlid), that is, refusal to innovate", follows one of the four legal schools or Madh'hab (Shafiʽi, Maliki, Hanafi, Hanbali), and may include Sufism. An example of Sufi traditionalism is the Barelvi school in Pakistan.
Fundamentalist reformism or revivalism, which criticizes the Islamic scholastic tradition, the commentaries, popular religious practices such as visitation to and veneration of the shrines and tombs of Muslim saints, perceived deviations and superstitions; it aims to return to the founding scriptures of Islam. This fundamentalist reformism generally developed in response to a perceived external threat (for example, the influence of Hinduism on Islam). 18th-century examples of fundamentalist Muslim reformers are Shah Waliullah Dehlawi in British India and Muhammad ibn Abd al-Wahhab in the Arabian peninsula, founder of the Islamic doctrine and movement known as Wahhabism. Salafism and Wahhabism worldwide, the Deobandi school in South Asia (mainly Pakistan and Afghanistan), Ahl-i Hadith and Tablighi Jamaat in India, Bangladesh, Indonesia, Malaysia, and Pakistan are modern examples of fundamentalist reformism and revivalism.
Islamism or political Islam, embracing a return to the sharia or Islamic law but adopting Western terminology such as revolution, ideology, politics, and democracy, and taking a more liberal attitude towards issues like jihad and women's rights. Contemporary examples include the Jamaat-e-Islami, Muslim Brotherhood, Iranian Islamic Revolution, Masyumi party, United Malays National Organisation, Pan-Malaysian Islamic Party and Justice and Development Party (Turkey).
Liberal and progressive movements within Islam generally define themselves in opposition to Islamist and Islamic fundamentalist political movements, but often embrace many of their anti-imperialist and Islam-inspired liberal reformist elements. Liberal Muslims affirm the promotion of progressive values such as democracy, gender equality, human rights, LGBT rights, women's rights, religious pluralism, interfaith marriage, freedom of expression, freedom of thought, and freedom of religion; opposition to theocracy and total rejection of Islamism and Islamic fundamentalism; and a modern view of Islamic theology, ethics, sharia, culture, tradition, and other ritualistic practices in Islam. Liberal Islam emphasizes the re-interpretation of the Islamic scriptures in order to preserve their relevance in the 21st century.

Shīʿa—Sunnī differences

According to the Iranian-American academic Vali Nasr, which serves as Majid Khaddouri Professor of International Affairs and Middle East Studies at the Johns Hopkins School of Advanced International Studies (SAIS), political tendencies of Shīʿa and Sunnī Islamic ideologies differ, with Sunnī fundamentalism "in Pakistan and much of the Arab world" being "far from politically revolutionary", primarily focused on attempting to Islamicize the political establishment rather than trying to change it through revolutionary struggle, whereas the Shīʿīte conception of political Islam is strongly influenced by Ruhollah Khomeini and his talk of the oppression of the poor and class war, which characterized the success of the Islamic Revolution in Iran (1978–1979):

The American political analyst and author Graham E. Fuller, specialized in the study of Islamism and Islamic extremism, has also noted that he found "no mainstream Islamist organization (with the exception of [Shīʿa] Iran) with radical social views or a revolutionary approach to the social order apart from the imposition of legal justice."

Guardianship of the Jurist of Shi'i Islam

Guardianship of the Jurist (Wilāyat al-Faqīh) is a concept in Twelver Shia Islamic law that holds that in the absence of (what Twelvers believe is) the religious and political leader of Islam—the "infallible Imam", who Shi'a believe will reappear sometime before Judgement Day) -- righteous Shi'i jurists (faqīh), should administer "some" of the "religious and social affairs" of the Shi'i community. In its "absolute" form—the form advanced by the Ayatollah Ruhollah Khomeini and the basis of government in Islamic Republic of Iran—the state and society are ruled by an Islamic jurist (Ali Khamenei as of 2022).

A variation of Islamism, the theory holds that since sharia law has everything needed to rule a state (whether ancient or modern), and any other basis of governance will lead to injustice and sin, a state must be ruled according to sharia and the person who should rule is an expert in sharia.

The theory of sovereignty of the Guardianship of the Jurist (in fact of all Islam) explained by at least one conservative Shi'i scholar (Mohammad-Taqi Mesbah-Yazdi), is contrasted with the theory of sovereignty in "most of the schools of political philosophy and other cultures". Non-Muslim cultures hold that "every man is free", and in democratic cultures in particular, "sovereignty ... belongs to the people". A ruler and government must have the consent of the governed to have political legitimacy. Whereas in fact, sovereignty is God's. The "entire universe and whatever in it belongs to God ... the Exalted, and all their movements and acts must have to be in accordance with the command or prohibition of the Real Owner". Consequently, human beings "have no right to rule over others or to choose someone to rule", i.e. choose someone to rule themselves. In an Islamic state, rule must be according to God's law and the ruler must be best person to enforce God's law. The people's "consent and approval" are valuable for developing and strengthening the Islamic government but irrelevant for its legitimacy.

See also

 Islam and secularism
 Islam and war
 Islam Yes, Islamic Party No
 Islamic democracy
 Islamic extremism
 International propagation of Salafism and Wahhabism (by region)
 Islamic terrorism
 Jihadism
 Petro-Islam
 Qutbism
 Salafism
 Salafi jihadism
 Takfirism
 Wahhabism
 Islamic revival
 Islamism
 Post-Islamism
 List of Islamic democratic political parties
 Modern Islamic philosophy
 Peace in Islamic philosophy
 Political philosophy of the Islamic Golden Age
 Political quietism in Islam
 Transformation of the Ottoman Empire

Notes

References

Sources
The following sources generally prescribe to the theory that there is a distinct 20th-century movement called Islamism:
 "Children of Abraham: An Introduction to Islam for Jews" Khalid Duran with Abdelwahab Hechiche, The American Jewish Committee and Ktav, 2001
 The Islamism Debate Martin Kramer, 1997, which includes the chapter The Mismeasure of Political Islam
 Liberal Islam: A Sourcebook, Charles Kurzman, Oxford University Press, 1998
 The Challenge of Fundamentalism: Political Islam and the New World Disorder, Bassam Tibi, Univ. of California Press, 1998

The following sources challenge the notion of an "Islamist movement":
Edward Said, OrientalismMerryl Wyn Davies, Beyond Frontiers: Islam and Contemporary NeedsG. H. Jansen, Militant Islam, 1980
Hamid Enayat, Modern Islamic Political ThoughtThese authors in general locate the issues of Islamic political intolerance and fanaticism not in Islam, but in the generally low level of awareness of Islam's own mechanisms for dealing with these, among modern believers, in part a result of Islam being suppressed prior to modern times.

Bibliography

 

Further reading
On democracy in the Middle East, the role of Islamist political parties, and the War on Terrorism:

 Ayoob, Mohammed. The Many Faces of Political Islam: Religion and Politics in the Muslim World. University of Michigan Press, 2007.
 Blecher, Robert "Free People Will Set the Course of History: Intellectuals, Democracy and American Empire", Middle East Report (March 2003).
 Remarks by the President at the 20th Anniversary of the National Endowment for Democracy, United States Chamber of Commerce, Washington, D.C., "President Bush Discusses Freedom in Iraq and Middle East", 6 November 2003.
 Fisk, Robert "What Does Democracy Really Mean In The Middle East? Whatever the West Decides", The Independent, 8 August 2005.
 Gambill, Gary "Jumpstarting Arab Reform: The Bush Administration's Greater Middle East Initiative", Middle East Intelligence Bulletin (Vol. 6, No. 6–7, June/July 2004).
 Gergez, Fawaz "Is Democracy in the Middle East a Pipedream?", Yale Global Online, April 25, 2005.
 Hayajneh, Adnan M. "The U.S. Strategy: Democracy and Internal Stability in the Arab World", Alternatives (Volume 3, No. 2 & 3, Summer/Fall 2004).
 Marina Ottoway, et al., "Democratic Mirage in the Middle East", Carnegie Endowment for Ethics and International Peace, Policy Brief 20 (October 20, 2002).
 Marina Ottoway and Thomas Carothers, "Think Again: Middle East Democracy", Foreign Policy (Nov./Dec. 2004).
 Raja, Masood Ashraf. "Muslim Modernity: Poetics, Politics, and Metaphysics". Gabriele Marranci, ed. Muslim Societies and the Challenge of Secularization: An Interdisciplinary Approach. Aberdeen: Springer, 2010: 99–112.
 Wright, Steven (2007). The United States and Persian Gulf Security: The Foundations of the War on Terror. Ithaca Press. .

External links
 Islam and Politics from the Dean Peter Krogh Foreign Affairs Digital Archives
 Liberal Democracy and Political Islam: The Search for Common Ground
 The Ideology of Terrorism and Violence in Saudi Arabia: Origins, Reasons and Solution
 Evaluating the Islamist movement by Greg Noakes, an American Muslim who works at the Washington Report.
 Muslim scholars face down fanaticism by Aicha Lemsine, an Algerian journalist and author.
 Peter Krogh discuses Islam and politics with John L. Esposito and Mary Jane Deeb on Great Decisions'' (1994).

 
Islamism